Francisco 'Chico' Oliveira Geraldes (born 18 April 1995) is a Portuguese professional footballer who plays for G.D. Estoril Praia as a midfielder.

Club career
Born in Lisbon, Geraldes joined local Sporting CP's youth system in 2003, aged 8. On 30 March 2013, whilst still a junior, he made his professional debut with their reserves, playing one minute in a 3–1 home loss against S.L. Benfica B in the Segunda Liga.

Geraldes spent the first part of the 2016–17 season on loan to Primeira Liga team Moreirense FC, his maiden appearance in the competition taking place on 13 August 2016 in a 1–1 home draw with F.C. Paços de Ferreira. His first goal came the following weekend, when he helped the visitors defeat C.D. Feirense 3–0 also as a starter.

In late January 2017, both Geraldes and Daniel Podence were recalled from their loans by Sporting manager Jorge Jesus. He made his competitive debut for his parent club on 11 March, coming on as a late substitute in the 4–1 away win over C.D. Tondela.

For 2017–18, still owned by Sporting, Geraldes signed with Rio Ave FC. The following campaign, in the same situation, he joined Germany's Eintracht Frankfurt.

Geraldes was loaned to AEK Athens F.C. on 24 June 2019, with no purchase option included in the deal. On 21 August 2020, he returned to Rio Ave on a permanent three-year contract. On 1 October, he equalised an eventual 2–2 home draw against A.C. Milan, and also converted his attempt in the penalty shoot-out loss in the play-off round of the UEFA Europa League.

On 30 July 2021, after 38 official appearances at the Estádio dos Arcos (one goal), Geraldes signed a two-year deal with newly-promoted G.D. Estoril Praia.

International career
Geraldes won two caps for Portugal at under-21 level. His first was on 6 October 2016, in a 3–3 draw in Hungary in the 2017 UEFA European Championship qualifiers where he provided an assist to Podence. The following month, he featured in the 3–1 friendly win against the Czech Republic in Setúbal.

Personal life
An avid reader, Geraldes listed George Orwell as his favourite author.

Career statistics

Honours
Moreirense
Taça da Liga: 2016–17

References

External links

1995 births
Living people
Portuguese footballers
Footballers from Lisbon
Association football midfielders
Primeira Liga players
Liga Portugal 2 players
Sporting CP B players
Sporting CP footballers
Moreirense F.C. players
Rio Ave F.C. players
G.D. Estoril Praia players
Eintracht Frankfurt players
Super League Greece players
AEK Athens F.C. players
Portugal youth international footballers
Portugal under-21 international footballers
Portuguese expatriate footballers
Expatriate footballers in Germany
Expatriate footballers in Greece
Portuguese expatriate sportspeople in Germany
Portuguese expatriate sportspeople in Greece